The 1894–95 British Home Championship was an international football tournament played between the British Home Nations. The competition was won by England, who like second placed Wales, did not lose a game. Wales however failed to win one either, scoring three draws and so finishing behind England. Scotland took joint second place with three points gained from a win, draw and a loss. Ireland came last with a single point garnered from their draw with Wales.

England and Ireland played the first match of the competition, the Irish suffering a 9–0 defeat in Derby to give England the immediate advantage. Ireland and Wales then played a 2–2 draw in Belfast before England and Wales drew at the Queen's Club, the only international football match ever played there. Wales finished their competition as Scotland entered it, the teams drawing in Wrexham to give Wales three points in an unbeaten tournament. Scotland beat Ireland in their second game, ending Ireland's tournament with a single point before England and Scotland, level on points, played out the decider at Goodison Park. In the event England were just too strong, easily dismissing their opponents 3–0 to win the trophy.

Table

Results

Winning squad

References

British
Home
Home
Home
British Home Championships
Brit
Brit